Juan Manuel "Juanma" Lobato Lobato (born 10 May 1988) is a Spanish footballer who plays for Arroyo CP as a central defender.

Football career
Born in La Línea de la Concepción, Province of Cádiz, Lobato finished his youth career with local Málaga CF, making his senior debuts with the B-team in the 2006–07 season, in Segunda División B. On 10 January 2007 he first appeared with the Andalusians' main squad, playing the last 33 minutes of a 0–3 home loss against Real Zaragoza for the season's Copa del Rey.

In July 2009 Lobato signed with Lucena CF. In his only season he was first-choice, totalling nearly 2,100 minutes of action.

Lobato continued competing in the third level in the following years, representing Cultural y Deportiva Leonesa, CD San Roque de Lepe, RCD Espanyol B, UE Llagostera. and Arroyo CP.

References

External links
 
  
 

1988 births
Living people
Spanish footballers
Footballers from Andalusia
Association football defenders
Segunda División B players
Tercera División players
Atlético Malagueño players
Málaga CF players
Lucena CF players
Cultural Leonesa footballers
CD San Roque de Lepe footballers
RCD Espanyol B footballers
UE Costa Brava players